Kai Kuk Shue Ha is a village in the North District of Hong Kong.

Administration
Kai Kuk Shue Ha is a recognized village under the New Territories Small House Policy. It is one of the villages represented within the Sha Tau Kok District Rural Committee. For electoral purposes, Kai Kuk Shue Ha is part of the Sha Ta constituency, which is currently represented by Ko Wai-kei.

History
At the time of the 1911 census, the population of Kai Kuk Shue Ha was 108. The number of males was 47.

See also
 Starling Inlet
 Kuk Po
 Nam Hang Mei

References

External links

 Delineation of area of existing village Kai Kuk Shue Ha and Nam Hang Mei (Sha Tau Kok) for election of resident representative (2019 to 2022)

Villages in North District, Hong Kong